The 9K35 Strela-10 is a Soviet highly mobile, short-range surface-to-air missile system. It is visually aimed, and utilizes optical/infrared-guidance. The system is primarily intended to engage low-altitude threats, such as helicopters. "9K35" is its GRAU designation; its NATO reporting name is SA-13 "Gopher".

Development
The 9K35 is the successor of the 9K31 Strela-1 and can also use the Strela-1's missiles in place of the 9M37.

Development of the 9K37 Strela-10SV system was initiated July 24, 1969. The decision to begin the development of a new non-all-weather system was taken despite the simultaneous development of an all-weather hybrid gun/missile system 9K22 "Tunguska" mainly as an economical measure. It was also seen as advantageous to have a system capable of fast reaction times and immunity to heavy radio-frequency jamming.

Rather than being mounted on an amphibious but lightly armoured BRDM chassis like the 9K31, the 9K35 is mounted on a more mobile tracked, modified MT-LB, with more room for equipment and missile reloads. Provision for amphibious capability is provided in some variants in the form of polyurethane-filled floats.

The Strela-10SV system and its 9M37 missile were tested in Donguzkom range from 1973 to 1974, but the results were disappointing: the system was found deficient in terms of missile probability of kill, vehicle reliability, among other things. Acceptance to service was thus delayed until May 16, 1976, by which time improvements had been introduced to the system.

Development of the system continued throughout the years through Strela-10M, −10M2 and −10M3 variants introducing among other things improved radio communications and provision for better integration to the Soviet integrated air defence system air picture data. Also improved missiles (9M37M and 9M333) have been developed and by September 2007 the 9K35M3-K Kolchan variant, mounted on a BTR-60 wheeled chassis, was displayed for the first time at the Moscow Air Show MAKS 2007.

The Russian Armed Forces will receive 72 advanced mobile “night” short-range anti-aircraft missile complexes “Strela-10M4″ by 2016. In 2014, the Russian Airborne Troops received the first batch of 18 “Strela-10M4″ vehicles. Modernization of equipment extends the “life” of an air defense system for 3–5 years.

The Strela-10M is expected to be replaced by the Sosna anti-aircraft missile system. The system is based on the MT-LB chassis consisting of 12 Sosna-R 9M337 beam rider missiles with a range of 10 km and altitude of 5 km.

Description

Associated systems and vehicles
The 9K35 is a SAM system with electro-optical guidance. It has the capability to use radars for target acquisition and range. Some vehicles have a pintle-mounted PKT 7.62 mm machine gun in front of the forward hatch for local protection. Other vehicles have been seen with additional support railings for the system on the rear deck. The following is a list of associated equipment:

 9A34M2, 9A34M3-K: launcher vehicle with 9S86 (NATO designation "SNAP SHOT") range only radar located between the two pairs of missile canisters on the transporter erector launcher and radar (TELAR) (maximum radar range is 450 to 10,000 m).
 9A35M2, 9A35M3-K: launcher vehicle with 9S16 (NATO designation "Flat Box-B") passive radar detection system that gives a 360° azimuth and minimum 40° elevation coverage
 9F624 and 9F624M training simulator
 9S482M7 Control Post.
 9U111: a 1,950 kg trailer-mounted 12 kW generator unit, designed to feed power to up to four 9A35M2, 9A35M3-K or 9A34M2, 9A34M3-K launcher vehicles at a distance of up to 30 m by cable while conducting maintenance or training operations.
 9V839M: system checkout vehicle
 9V915M, 9V915M-1: technical maintenance vehicle
 MT-LBU with 9S80 (NATO designatino "DOG EAR")  F/G-band target acquisition radar (maximum range 80 km (50 miles))
 Ranzhir-M 9S737М (GRAU designation 9S737); is a mobile command center for a mixed grouping of air defense forces,  such as the Tor, Tunguska, Strela-10, and Igla.

Missiles

The Strela-10 system was originally designed to use the 9M37 missile as its primary weapon, but its launch system was designed to be also backwards compatible with the 9M31M missile of the earlier 9K31 Strela-1.

Each 9M37 missile is 2,200 mm (7.2 ft) long, weighs 40 kg (88 pounds) and carries a 3.5 kg (7–15 pound) warhead. The maximum speed of the missile is near Mach 2, engagement range is from 800 to 5000 m (0.3–3 miles) and engagement altitude is between 10 and 3500 m (33-11,500 ft). (The ranges define the zone of target intercept, minimum and maximum launch distances are longer for approaching and shorter for receding targets, depending on the target's speed, altitude and flight direction.)

Four missiles are mounted on the turret in boxes, ready to launch, and eight more are carried inside the vehicle as reloads. Reloading takes around 3 minutes.

The 9M37 was quickly replaced with a slightly improved 9M37M (main improvement was in more efficient autopilot system for missile flight path control), and later the more significantly upgraded 9M333, which introduced:
 heavier warhead of improved expanding-rod design and larger HE content
 new proximity fuzing with 8-ray laser to improve probability of fuzing on near misses of very small targets such as cruise missiles or UAVs
 triple-channel guidance system for more robust countermeasure rejection
 improved engine to provide similar performance despite the slight increase in missile length and weight.

All missiles—9M31M, 9M37, 9M37M and 9M333—are equipped with optical homing heads utilizing reticle-based photocontrast and/or infrared homing. 9M333 is said to have particularly good countermeasures resistance due to its triple-channel homing head, while the photocontrast channel of 9M37/9M37M is described as back-up method to the IR channel.

All main variants—Strela-10SV, Strela-10M, Strela-10M2 and Strela-10M3—can use all aforementioned missile types.

The main characteristics of the missiles are listed in the table below, based on source number, unless otherwise noted. For comparison purposes data for nearest western equivalent, the somewhat larger and heavier MIM-72 Chaparral, is also provided.

As the photocontrast channel provides effective head-on engagement ability, firing range against an approaching target can be considerably longer than the maximum ranges listed above, likewise maximum firing range would be considerably less than the maximum range of target destruction against a receding target. Definition of range and effective ceiling for MIM-72 is unknown and the figures are therefore not directly comparable.

(*) Contract for production of MIM-72G by retrofitting new components was awarded in late 1982, with all missile in US service upgraded by the late 1980s. New production of MIM-72G missiles started in 1990.

Combat use

Angolan Civil War
On February 20, 1988, 31-year-old Major Edward Richard Every from 1st Squadron, SAAF, was killed in action when his Mirage F1AZ (serial 245) was shot down by a Cuban Strela-10 surface-to-air missile in Cuatir (near Menongue) while on an attack mission over Southern Angola.

Operation Desert Storm
Iraq had several operational Strela-10 systems at the beginning of the 1991 operation to liberate Kuwait from Iraqi occupation, most if not all of which were organized as part of the battlefield air defence systems of the Republican Guard divisions.

During the operation, 27 coalition aircraft are believed to have been hit by Iraqi IR-homing SAMs, resulting in 14 losses. Some of the losses were shot down on the spot, while others, such as OA-10A 77-0197, returned to base only to be lost in a crash landing. Others landed safely, but were written off as total losses.

At least two losses are believed to have been due to Strela-10s: On February 15 an A-10A (78-0722) of 353rd TFS/354th TFW was hit by a SAM believed to be a Strela-10, some 100 km north west of Kuwait City, while attacking Republican Guard targets. Pilot Lt Robert Sweet ejected and was made a prisoner of war. While attempting to protect Sweet on the ground, his wingman Steven Phyllis flying A-10A 79-0130 was also hit by what is believed to have been a Strela-10. Phyllis was killed in the incident.

Kosovo War 
During NATO bombing campaign against FR Yugoslavia, Strela-10 managed to hit an A-10 of United States Air Force on 11 May 1999.

Syrian Civil War
On April 14, 2018, American, British, and French forces launched a barrage of 105 air-to-surface and cruise missiles targeting eight sites in Syria. According to a Russian source, five Strela-10 missiles launched in response destroyed three incoming missiles, However, the American Department of Defense stated in a daily press briefing that no Allied missiles were shot down.

2020 Nagorno-Karabakh conflict
The Armenian Air Defense employed Strela-10 missile systems during the 2020 Nagorno-Karabakh conflict. During the opening days of the war, several videos released by the Azerbaijani military showed several Armenian 9K33 Osa and Strela-10 vehicles destroyed by Bayraktar TB2 armed drones.

Russian Invasion of Ukraine 2022
A Strela-10 from the Ukrainian Armed Forces was recorded running over a civilian car in the opening weeks of the war. The driver of the car was uninjured. A Russian Strela-10M guarding Snake Island was destroyed by a Bayraktar TB2 on 30 April 2022. A Ukrainian Strela-10M system was reported destroyed by the Russian Air Force near Lisichansk on 17 June 2022.

Operators

Current operators
 
 
 
  4(20 in store)
 
 :
 : 42
 
 
 
 : In service as of January 2019.
 
 : 8 launchers
 
 
 : 350. In production the missile 9M333 (2021). 100 Strela-10MNs in 2012–2020.
 : 18 
  35; a relatively old information
 : 2+ in service as of 2016
 : 150
 : 20

Former operators

 : Withdrawn from service.
 : Withdrawn from service.
 : Withdrawn from service.
 : Passed on successor states.
 : Withdrawn from service.
 : Some destroyed in combat, all remaining units were written off after the Iraq War in 2003.
 : 4, probably withdrawn in 2001–2002.
 : Withdrawn from service.
 : Passed on successor states.
 : Passed on successor states

Gallery

See also
 9K31 Strela-1

References

External links

 Federation of American Scientists page 
 Asronautix.com
 Video on the arc-lamp proximity fuze

Cold War surface-to-air missiles of the Soviet Union
Self-propelled anti-aircraft weapons of the Soviet Union
Self-propelled anti-aircraft weapons of Russia
9K35
9K35
KB Tochmash products
Military equipment introduced in the 1970s